Mega Records was a Nashville, Tennessee-based music label founded in 1970 by former RCA Records executive Brad McCuen along with Harry E. Pratt. Its most successful recording artist was Sammi Smith who also recorded the label's very first single.  She would record 16 chart singles for the Mega label.  Mega's other notable recording artist was Apollo 100.  The continuing Bill Black's Combo also recorded for the label, which lasted until 1976.

See also
 List of record labels

References

External links
 Mega Records story from BSN Pubs

Defunct record labels of the United States